Puyo Puyo (ぷよぷよ), previously known as Puyo Pop outside Japan, is a series of tile-matching video games created by Compile. Sega has owned the franchise since 1998, with games after 2001 being developed by Sonic Team. Puyo Puyo was created as a spin-off franchise to Madō Monogatari (Sorcery Saga), a series of first-person dungeon crawler role-playing games by Compile from which the Puyo Puyo characters originated.

Gameplay
Generally, the objective of Puyo Puyo games is to defeat your opponent by causing the third column from the left of their side of the screen to become filled with Puyo. Puyo are round, slime-like creatures that, in most variations of the game, fall from the top of the screen in groups of two, three, and four. The pieces can be moved, dropped, and rotated as they fall. The piece falls until it reaches another Puyo or the bottom of the screen. When four or more Puyo of the same color line up adjacent to each other, the Puyo will connect to each other, "Pop", and disappear. Puyo of the same color can connect horizontally or vertically, but not diagonally.

The Puyo above those that are cleared fall onto other pieces or the bottom of the screen. Simultaneous Pops (同時消し, simultaneous erasing) are created when more than one group is formed at a time.

A Chain is made when falling Puyo cause a new group of Puyo to Pop, making a chain reaction. When a Chain is achieved, Garbage Puyo, or Ojama Puyo (お邪魔ぷよ, hindrance Puyo) are sent to either clog the opponent's screen or to cancel out (offset, 相殺) the Garbage Puyo sent by the opponent. Garbage Puyo are translucent pieces that disappear when Puyo are popped next to them. If multiple groups of Puyo are cleared in succession due to a chain, the amount of Garbage Puyo will increase based solely on the number of steps in the chain. Garbage Puyo are cached above the opponent's playing field, and do not fall until the attacker's chain concludes, and then the defender puts down a piece. Garbage Puyo block the opponents' playing fields, and can cause them to lose if one is placed the third spot from the left in the top row.

Games

Compile games

The first Puyo Puyo game was developed by Compile and released in 1991 for the MSX2 and Family Computer Disk System; the latter release was published by Tokuma Shoten as a pack-in for their Famimaga magazine. The puzzle game features characters from the 1990 role-playing video game Madō Monogatari 1-2-3, also developed by Compile. The game includes "Endless" mode, where the player attempts to amass a large score, "Mission" mode, where the player is given a pre-configured board and must attempt to satisfy conditions, and a two-player competitive mode.

Compile and Sega collaborated to create an arcade version of Puyo Puyo. It was released in October 1992 for Sega's System C2 hardware. Unlike the previous release, the game focuses on competitive play; the single-player mode consists of a gauntlet consisting of either 3, 10, or 13 computer opponents, while the multiplayer mode allows two human players to battle each other. The game was ported to several major platforms in Japan, with the Mega Drive becoming a bestseller.

The game was followed by Puyo Puyo 2 in September 1994, also released for Sega System C2. Puyo Puyo 2 adds the ability to counter the opponent's chains; additionally, it changes the single-player gauntlet from a linear structure to a roulette-based structure that requires the player to pass certain score thresholds to advance. Like its predecessor, Puyo Puyo 2 was released on a variety of home platforms. In 2004, it was included in the Sega Ages 2500 line of PlayStation 2 games.

Puyo Puyo Sun, released in 1996 for the Sega Titan Video arcade hardware, adds a "Sun Puyo" mechanic that allows the player to send extra garbage to opponents. Puyo Puyo~n, released in 1999 for the Dreamcast, adds character-specific powers that assist the player in clearing Puyo. Compile's final Puyo Puyo game, Puyo Puyo BOX, includes ports of the first two arcade games alongside original content.

Compile released a variety of spin-off titles on home consoles, handhelds, and through their Disc Station disk magazine. The Nazo Puyo series expands on the original Puyo Puyos Mission mode, with the 1994 Nazo Puyo: Arle no Roux for Game Gear, 1995 Super Nazo Puyo: Rulue no Roux for Super Famicom and 1996 Super Nazo Puyo 2: Rulue no Tetsuwan Hanjouki for Super Famicom introducing role-playing elements. Other notable spin-offs include the roguelike Waku Waku Puyo Puyo Dungeon (1998, Sega Saturn and PlayStation), Puyo Puyo DA! dancing game (1998, arcade and Dreamcast), and Arle no Bouken: Mahou no Jewel monster-collecting role-playing game (2000, Game Boy Color).

Sonic Team-developed games
Sonic Team's first Puyo Puyo game was Minna de Puyo Puyo for the Game Boy Advance, released in Japan in 2001 and elsewhere in 2002 as Puyo Pop. It is one of three games named Puyo Pop.

Sega released Puyo Pop Fever on November 26, 2003, for their NAOMI arcade hardware. The game features a mostly new set of characters, alongside new gameplay mechanics such as Fever Mode. Like its arcade predecessors, Fever was ported to many platforms; the Dreamcast version notably serves as Sega's final first party video game. A direct sequel, Puyo Puyo Fever 2 was released in 2005. Fever 2 added more characters and an expanded single-player mode. Puyo Puyo 7, released in 2009, adds a third protagonist and includes a new "Transformation" gameplay system.

In addition, games celebrating Puyo Puyos 15th and 20th Anniversary were released. Puyo Puyo! 15th Anniversary (2006) includes more than ten gameplay rulesets, including the rules of the first Puyo Puyo, Puyo Puyo 2, and Puyo Puyo Fever, reintroduces characters that were absent from the series since Minna de Puyo Puyo, and gives every character in the game a single-player story. Puyo Puyo!! 20th Anniversary (2011) adds even more rulesets, such as Sun rules.

Puyo Puyo Tetris and Puyo Puyo Tetris 2, released in 2014 and 2020, includes both Puyo Puyo and Tetris gameplay.

Puyo Puyo!! Quest is a free-to-play role-playing game released for iOS and Android in 2013. Sega has claimed that the game is a major success, and stated that the game has reached 11 million downloads and a monthly income of over 500 million yen (approx. US$4 million, using February 20, 2015 exchange rates) as of February 2015.

Puyo Puyo was a mini-game in Hatsune Miku: Project Mirai Deluxe/DX in 2015. In game, this was called Puyo Puyo 39.

Puyo Puyo Chronicle was released on December 8, 2016, in Japan for Nintendo 3DS, as part of the original Puyo Puyo game's 25th anniversary with no plans for localization, despite the demand for it. Unlike the other anniversary games, it features a role-playing game mode, although the classic rules are also included, and features a new character named Ally.

Puyo Puyo Champions (named Puyo Puyo eSports in Japan), a digital title with an emphasis on eSports tournament play, was released for PlayStation 4 and Nintendo Switch on October 25, 2018, in Japan. It was released in North America and Europe on May 7, 2019.

International releases
The 1992 arcade Puyo Puyo was translated to English with character name changes and minor visual changes to Harpy, renamed Dark Elf, character's skit. Sega added this version into their Sega Ages port on Nintendo Switch.

Instead of directly translating the Mega Drive version of the 1992 arcade game, Sega decided to replace the Madou Monogatari cast with villains from the Adventures of Sonic the Hedgehog animated television series. The resulting game, Dr. Robotnik's Mean Bean Machine, was released in 1993, along with a Game Gear version adapted from Nazo Puyo. Nintendo followed suit in 1995, modifying Super Puyo Puyo into Kirby's Avalanche (Kirby's Ghost Trap in Europe), featuring Kirby characters. Spectrum HoloByte also released a Puyo Puyo title for Microsoft Windows 3.1 and the Macintosh in August 1995, under the name Qwirks.

The next localized release was in 1999, when the Neo Geo Pocket Color port of Puyo Puyo 2 was released in English as Puyo Pop. Unlike the arcade translation, most characters kept their original names; only the character Satan retained his English arcade title of the Dark Prince.  After the Game Boy Advance Puyo Pop, Puyo Pop Fever saw a worldwide release, with North America receiving the GameCube and Nintendo DS versions and Europe receiving it on the majority of platforms it came out on.  Finally, the Mega Drive version of Puyo Puyo 2 was released, untranslated, on the Wii's Virtual Console as an import title and the arcade version of Puyo Puyo 2 is included in Sega 3D Classics Collection.  Also the N-Gage Puyo Pop was released worldwide in 2003.  As the game Hatsune Miku: Project Mirai Deluxe/DX was released worldwide, consequently also its Puyo Puyo mini-game saw release outside Japan. Sonic Runners ran a collaboration event with Puyo Puyo!! Quest in July 2015. 

On January 12, 2017, it was announced that Puyo Puyo Tetris would come overseas on the Nintendo Switch and the PlayStation 4 in Q2 2017. This marks the first time a localized Puyo Puyo game was marketed overseas under its original name.

Other releases

Disney Interactive Studios released its own version of Puyo Puyo for Windows 95 and Macintosh named Timon & Pumbaa's Bug Drop in 1995 as part of Disney's Hot Shots series of PC games. This version features Timon and Pumbaa from The Lion King film franchise, and Puyo are replaced by bugs. This version was also included, simply titled Bug Drop, in the PC compilation game Timon & Pumbaa's Jungle Games.

2003's Billy Hatcher and the Giant Egg features an unlockable Puyo Pop minigame, which requires the use of the GameCube – Game Boy Advance link cable to download the minigame to a Game Boy Advance.

In July 2005, Bandai released Kidou Gekidan Haro Ichiza: Haro no Puyo Puyo (機動劇団はろ一座 ハロのぷよぷよ) (lit. "Mobile Theatrical Company Haro: Haro's Puyo Puyo") in Japan for the GBA. It is based on the Mobile Suit Gundam anime series and presented in the style of the SD Gundam series. In this game, Puyo are replaced by Gundam's mascot, Haro.

On September 10, 2015, it was announced that Rin Hoshizora of the anime Love Live! will serve as the new star of the Puyo Puyo games, though it is unknown if this is to be a one-time spin-off (similar to Haro no Puyo Puyo) or a part of the main series.

A new mobile game, Puyo!! Touch, was released for iOS and Android devices on November 26, 2015, but the service shutdown on November 30, 2016, citing lackluster performance in the market.

A free-to-play version, Puyo Puyo VS, was released for Microsoft Windows and focuses on multiplayer battles.

Sonic Mania (2017) contains a Puyo Puyo minigame as a boss battle in the Chemical Plant Zone and as an unlockable mode, directly referencing Dr. Robotnik's Mean Bean Machine. Director Christian Whitehead considered it the most "complex" boss fight for them to develop.

Puyo Puyo is playable via in-game arcade machines in Yakuza 6 and the PlayStation 4 version of Judgment.

Development
Puyo Puyo was originally conceived by Compile employee and Sting Entertainment founder Kazunari Yonemitsu. Yonemitsu felt that the puzzle games at the time had "weak" characters and thus decided to create a puzzle game using characters from Compile's Madou Monogatari RPG series. The success of Street Fighter II influenced Puyo Puyos focus on competitive gameplay, with Yonemitsu trying out many mechanics in an attempt to recapture the fighting game's competitive nature.

In March 1998, Sega obtained the rights to the Puyo Puyo series and its characters from Compile, while Compile continued to develop and publish Puyo Puyo games, even on platforms that Sega was competing against. These games include Sega in their copyright information. Prior to assuming full development duties for the franchise, Sega ported Puyo Puyo 2 to the WonderSwan.

Sales
Sega Sammy reported in 2021 that the sum of games sold, downloads of free-to-play titles, registered IDs totaled 35 million. This figure does not account for units sold prior to Sega's acquisition of the series.

Other media

For the franchise's 24th anniversary, a stage play adaptation titled Puyo Puyo On Stage ran from May 2 to May 6, 2015, in Japan.

References

External links
 

 
Fictional trios
Fictional quartets
Puzzle video games
Sega Games franchises
Sonic Team games
Video game franchises
Video game franchises introduced in 1991